Bruno Enrico Veglio Araújo (born 12 February 1998) is a Uruguayan footballer who plays as a midfielder for Montevideo Wanderers in the Uruguayan Primera División.

Career
Veglio signed his first professional contract in July 2018 with Montevideo Wanderers, effectively ending his seven-year youth career with the club. He made his professional debut for the club on 26 February 2019, coming on as an 82nd-minute substitute for Francisco Ginella in a 4-1 victory over Nacional. After breaking into the first team as a frequent starter the following season, Veglio suffered a season-ending knee injury in November 2020. He would make his return to first team football at the season-opening 2021 Supercopa Uruguaya.

Career statistics

Club

References

External links
 
 

1998 births
Living people
Montevideo Wanderers F.C. players
Uruguayan Primera División players
Uruguayan footballers
Association football midfielders
Footballers from Montevideo